The European Nations Cup was a professional team golf tournament on the Ladies European Tour that was held in Spain. It was played from 2008 to 2011, and was a stroke play competition comprising fourballs for the first and third rounds and a variation on greensomes for the second and fourth rounds. It is an unofficial event and earnings do not count on the LET official money list.

Winners

1Nordqvist and Gustafson defeated Webb and Lunn on the third playoff hole.

External links

Ladies European Tour

Former Ladies European Tour events
Golf tournaments in Spain